This list of botanical gardens and arboretums in Arizona is intended to include all significant botanical gardens and arboretums in the U.S. state of Arizona.

See also

 List of botanical gardens and arboretums in the United States
 Gardens in Arizona

References 

 
 
Botanical gardens
Botanical gardens
Botanical gardens
Botanical gardens
Botanical gardens
Botanical gardens